Love's Been Rough on Me is the twentieth studio album by Etta James, released in 1997 through Private Music. AllMusic noted "... a record that delivers the real goods with grace and style".

The album reached a peak position of number 6 on the Billboard Top Blues Albums chart.

Track listing

Personnel
Etta James – lead vocals

Backing vocalists
Vicki Hampton 
Yvonne Hodges 
Donna McElroy
Louis Dean Nunley 
John Wesley Ryles
Dennis Wilson
Curtis Young

Musicians
Eddie Bayers – drums
Barry Beckett – keyboards
Paul Franklin – steel guitar
Mike Haynes – trumpet
Jim Horn – saxophone
Dann Huff – electric guitar
Sam Levine – saxophone
Chris McDonald – trombone
Joe McGlohon – saxophone
Terry McMillan – percussion
Steve Nathan – keyboards
Don Potter – acoustic guitar
Michael Rhodes – bass guitar
Brent Rowan – electric guitar
Josh Sklair – electric guitar

References

1997 albums
Albums produced by Barry Beckett
Etta James albums
Private Music albums